Wild parsnip is a common name for several plants and may refer to:

Wild parsnip (Pastinaca sativa), is a Eurasian weed with edible root but toxic sap in the leaves and stems
Garden angelica (wild celery)
Giant hogweed (Heracleum mantegazzianum), which is extremely toxic
Several Australian species in the genus Trachymene
Trachymene incisa